Near-Earth orbit or Near Earth orbit may refer to:
 Low Earth orbit, orbits around Earth that are near it
 Near-Earth space, space of the main geocentric orbits
 Near-Earth object orbits, Solar orbits that bring things in those orbits near the orbit of the Earth